Fabio Mirto Frangipani (died 17 March 1587) was a Roman Catholic prelate who served as Titular Archbishop of Nazareth (1572–1587) and Bishop of Caiazzo (1537–1572).

Biography
On 10 July 1537, he was appointed during the papacy of Pope Paul III as Bishop of Caiazzo. On 5 November 1572, he resigned as Bishop of Caiazzo and was appointed during the papacy of Pope Gregory XIII as Titular Archbishop of Nazareth. He died on 17 March 1587.

Episcopal succession
While bishop, he was the principal co-consecrator of:
Fabio Capelleto, Bishop of Lacedonia (1555);
Virgilio Rosario, Bishop of Ischia (1555); 
Mario Bolognini, Archbishop of Lanciano (1579); and 
Flaminio Filonardi, Bishop of Aquino (1579).

References

External links and additional sources
 (for Chronology of Bishops) 
 (for Chronology of Bishops)  
 (for Chronology of Bishops) 
 (for Chronology of Bishops)  

16th-century Roman Catholic titular bishops
Bishops appointed by Pope Paul III
Bishops appointed by Pope Gregory XIII
1587 deaths
Apostolic Nuncios to France
16th-century Italian Roman Catholic bishops